Humphrey Plantagenet may refer to:

Humphrey of Lancaster, 1st Duke of Gloucester (1390–1447)
Humphrey, 2nd Earl of Buckingham (1381–1399)